WTI Transport, Inc. is a for-hire carrier based in Tuscaloosa, Alabama with terminals in Birmingham, Mobile and Whites Creek, TN. A flatbed company of approximately 370 tractors, WTI hauls freight throughout the Southeast, Midwest, Southwest, and East Coast. WTI’s fleet is a mixture of company drivers and owner-operators. Shipments consist mainly of roofing, building materials, and all types of aluminum, iron and steel products. Currently, WTI is a subsidiary of Daseke

Business Model and Equipment 
The WTI business model allows drivers to select Company, Lease or Owner-Operator opportunities. Company drivers can request Regional or OTR positions. Entrepreneurial drivers may pursue truck ownership through WTI’s tractor purchase programs. Owner-Operators can partner with WTI to grow their business with loads offered through McLeod's LoadMaster software.

WTI's equipment is eclectic.  Assigned tractors and those available for purchase are late model   Internationals, Freightliners, Peterbilts, Macks and Kenworths.  Trailers are 48’ and 53’, steel or aluminum, manufactured by Utility, Benson, Great Dane, Fontaine and Reitnouer.

History 
WTI was founded in 1989 under the name Welborn Transportation by owners, Stephen Rumsey and Miller Welborn whose fleet of 12 flatbed owner operators hauled freight throughout the Southeast.
In December 1997, Boyd Bros. Transportation merged with Welborn Transportation and later changed the Welborn name to WTI Transport, Inc.

On November 14, 2013, Daseke, of Addison, Texas merged with Boyd Bros.Transportation bringing WTI into the family of Daseke companies. With this merger, Daseke became ranked in the Top Five Open-deck/specialty carriers in North America.  Following the 2013 Boyd merger, Daseke acquired Lone Star Transportation, a Fort Worth Texas company, Bull Dog HiWay Express of Charleston, South Carolina and Hornady Transportation, of Monroeville, Alabama. These mergers placed Daseke Inc. as North America’s 2nd largest Flatbed Specialty carrier in terms of tractors and revenue.

On December 22, 2016 Daseke announced its merger with Hennessy Capital Acquisition Corp II and on February 28, 2017 became a publicly traded company on Nasdaq under the tickers DSKE and DSKEW.

Daseke through its family of companies: WTI Transport, Boyd Brothers, Boyd Logistics, Mid-Seven Transportation, Smokey Point Distributing, E.W. Wylie, J. Grady Randolph, Central Oregon Truck Company, Lone Star Transportation, Bull Dog HiWay Express and Hornady Transportation, controls an aggregate fleet of more than 3,000 tractors and 6,000 flatbed/specialized trailers which serve 49 U.S. states as well as Canada and Mexico.

Awards 
Belonging to the American Trucking Association, Truckload Carriers Association, and Alabama Trucking Association, WTI has been recognized for its safety, service and driver culture. Awards and honors have included:

 2015 ATA Safety Management Council – First in the Flatbed/Line-haul Division, Over 10 Million Miles Category and First in the Flatbed/Local Division, Unlimited Miles Category
 2014 First Place Safety Award in the Flatbed Division with the American Trucking Association and the Second Place Award in Industrial Safety and Risk Management
 2013 2nd Place in the Industrial Safety Contest for Flatbed Division
 2015 Owen Corning Sustainability Award
 2011, 2012, 2013 and 2015 Truckload Carriers Association (TCA) and CarriersEdge Best Fleets To Drive For in North America

Community Involvement 
One of the largest employers in Tuscaloosa, WTI partners with local community agencies such as Habitat for Humanity, Tuscaloosa Veterans Administration, Tuscaloosa school system and Tuscaloosa Chamber of Commerce. Annually, WTI represents the transportation industry in the SW Alabama’s Worlds Of Work Career Expo.

References

External links
 WTI Transport

Trucking companies of the United States
Privately held companies based in Alabama
Companies based in Tuscaloosa, Alabama
Transportation companies based in Alabama
Transport companies established in 1989
American companies established in 1989
1989 establishments in Alabama